Amblonoxia is a genus of dusty June beetles in the family Scarabaeidae. There are six described species in Amblonoxia.

Species
 Amblonoxia bidentata (Fall, 1932)
 Amblonoxia carpenteri (LeConte, 1876)
 Amblonoxia fieldi (Fall, 1908)
 Amblonoxia harfordi (Casey, 1889)
 Amblonoxia palpalis (Horn, 1880)
 Amblonoxia riversi (Casey, 1895)

References

Further reading

 
 
 
 
 

Melolonthinae
Articles created by Qbugbot